The Ambassador of Italy to the United Arab Emirates (in arabic: سفير الأيطاليا في الإمارات العربية المتحدة) is Italy's foremost diplomatic representative in the United Arab Emirates, and head of the Italy's diplomatic mission in the United Arab Emirates. The current ambassador in charge since October 1, 2019 is Nicola Lener.

List 
The following is a list of Italian ambassadors in the United Arab Emirates.

References

External links 

 Official website of the Italian Embassy in Abu Dhabi, on ambabudhabi.esteri.it.

United Arab Emirates
Italy
Ambassadors of Italy to the United Arab Emirates